Dorraj-e Sofla (also Romanized as Dorrāj-e Soflá and Darāj-e Soflá) is a village in Quri Chay-ye Gharbi Rural District, Saraju District, Maragheh County, East Azerbaijan Province, Iran. At the 2006 census, its population was 102, in 22 families.

References 

Towns and villages in Maragheh County